Jakobstad is a town and municipality in Ostrobothnia, Finland. Neighboring municipalities are Larsmo, Pedersöre, and Nykarleby.

Origin of the names
The Swedish name literally means Jacob's City or Jacob's Town, in reference to Jacob De la Gardie. The town was founded at the old harbour of the parish Pedersöre and this name lives on in the Finnish name of the municipality, Pietarsaari, literally Peter's Island.

History 
The town was founded in 1652 by Ebba Brahe, the widow of the military commander Jacob De la Gardie, and was granted city privileges by Queen Christina of Sweden. The town was founded at the old harbour of the parish Pedersöre. Pedersöre remains an independent municipality neighbouring Jakobstad.

The city grew slowly at first, with the authorities scarcely promoting any growth. In 1680 the inhabitants were ordered to relocate to the cities of Karleby (Kokkola), Uleåborg (Oulu) and Nykarleby, but the order was rescinded. Wars also contributed to the slow growth, and the city was invaded by Russian troops twice during the Greater Wrath, and large parts of the town were burnt to the ground. A majority of the inhabitants fled the city. While those with means moved across the sea to the Swedish side, others took shelter in the forest or in the archipelago. Many were captured or killed. During the 1720s, some of the previous inhabitants returned, while newcomers also added to the population. The subsequent decades were finally marked by a period of growth, and the current church was built in 1731.

The economic foundation was laid in the mid 18th century, with tar manufacturing and tobacco packaging at its centre. Trade started to develop rapidly in Jakobstad as of 1765, when the cities along the Finnish shore of the Gulf of Bothnia were granted privileges by the Swedish crown to trade directly with foreign countries. This also led to shipbuilding becoming a major activity in Jakobstad. The first ships to sail with goods to foreign countries were the galeas Jacobstads Wapen and the brig Enigheten. Trade and shipbuilding made Jakobstad a wealthy city, and a notable businessman of that time was the merchant and shipbuilder Adolf Lindskog, who also became one of the richest men in Finland.

The early 19th century was a time of upheaval, which saw the 1808–1809 war between Sweden and Russia, as well as a devastating fire in 1835 that destroyed approximately half of the city. Despite this, the economic progress continued, and a brewery, a matchstick factory and several banks were founded after 1850. In 1859, the merchant and shipowner Peter Malm started a steam powered sawmill, which was only the second such installation in Finland. The Crimean War was a major setback to shipping industry, as the British navy puts up an effective blockade and the shipping fleet in Jakobstad during the Åland War was reduced from 26 ships to 9.

Notable businessmen in the 19th century were Otto Malm and Wilhelm Schauman, the latter founding a chicory (coffee substitute) factory in Jakobstad in 1883. This moment in time is usually considered as the start of industrialization in Jakobstad. In 1900, the Strengberg tobacco factory was the largest employer in Jakobstad.

An artillery school was located in Jakobstad during the Finnish civil war. During World War II, the city was bombed once by Soviet bomber planes, causing a few casualties. Up until the 1960s, the town was overwhelmingly Swedish speaking, but as a consequence of industrial expansion in the 1960s and 1970s, the need for additional work force caused a large influx of Finnish speakers. The town remains bilingual with  being Swedish and  Finnish speakers.

Early industries

During the second half of the 19th century, the city changed from a city of shipping to an industrial city. From 1850 to 1900, the population increased from about 1,500 to over 6,000 inhabitants. The existing factories developed rapidly and new factories were established. Production in the factories was still small-scale. The city produced everything from beer and spirits to soaps and matches. The Finnish-speaking population in the city increased sharply when the tobacco factory expanded and was in great need of labor.

Politics 
Results of the 2017 Finnish municipal election in Jakobstad:

Events 
At the end of July, Jakobsdagar takes place. The event lasts for an entire week and includes various festivities such as concerts, merchant stalls, competitions, and performances. It attracts a large number of people each year. 

The name of the event translates to "Jacob's days" and refers to the name of the city.  

At the end of November a chamber music festival called Rusk is held annually in Pietarsaari/Jakobstad. At the heart of this festival embracing superb chamber music and various other genres of the arts is the Schauman Hall in the centre of town, but the events also spread out into the surrounding urban environment.

Culture and sights 

Jakobstad City Hall (in Swedish: Jakobstads rådhus) is a historic building in the city which was completed in 1875. The current look of the building dates from 1890.
Jakobstad is the home of the galeas Jacobstads Wapen, a full-scale replica built between 1987 and 1992, based on the original 1755 drawings by Swedish naval architect Fredrik Henrik af Chapman 
Jakobstad - Pietarsaari Museum is the main museum in the city, concentrating on maritime and ship building history
The Arctic museum Nanoq is located just outside Jakobstad.
 Cikoriamuseet was the only museum focused on chicory in Finland. In the former chicory factory from the 19th century, visitors can familiarize themselves with the production of chicory, get acquainted with Wilhelm Schaumans early industrial career and also experience authentic old factory conditions. The museum in Pietarsaari will also offer art exhibitions and other events.
The botanical garden Skolparken (in Swedish: "the school park"), with approximately 1,000 plant species, is renowned both as one of the most northerly botanical gardens in the world and for its classical park architecture. The foundation was laid in 1915 and the park was completed in 1932. The funding was provided by the Schauman family, who wanted to honour the memory of Elise and Viktor Schauman. The park was designed by the prominent Finnish garden architect Bengt Schalin.
Skata is a protected residential area close to the city centre which dates from 1783. Up until the late 19th century, Skata was home primarily to sailors and their families. As of the 1890s, it transformed into a mainly working class area, providing housing to a large part of the work force employed by the Strengberg tobacco factory.
 Pedersöre Church

Food 
In the 1980s, a rural liverwurst was named traditional food of Jakobstad. The culture of cafés and restaurants is lively in Jakobstad anyway, as the Strengberg tobacco factory was the first Finnish industrial plant to offer lunch to its employees. Jakobstad has ethnic restaurants, home-cooked lunch restaurants, à la carte restaurants and cafés, pubs and nightclubs.

Sports 
The town's football team FF Jaro currently plays in Ykkönen, the second league in Finland. The woman's league football club FC United has been very successful over the years.

Twin towns – sister cities

Jakobstad is twinned with:

 Asker, Norway
 Bünde, Germany
 Eslöv, Sweden
 Garðabær, Iceland
 Jamestown, United States
 Jūrmala, Latvia
 Rudersdal, Denmark

Notable people

Alexei Eremenko Jr., footballer
Roman Eremenko, footballer
Sara Forsberg, singer, actress, and comedian
Bertel Jung, architect and urban planner
Mathias "Vreth" Lillmåns, singer of Finnish metal band Finntroll
Karl and his son Walter Nars, industrialists
Fredrik Norrena, ice-hockey player (goalkeeper)
Jens Portin, footballer
Jonas Portin, footballer
Fredrika Runeberg, writer
Johan Ludvig Runeberg, national poet and author of the national anthem of Finland
Tomas Sandström, ice-hockey player
Ossian Schauman, founder of the Swedish-speaking non-governmental organization Folkhälsan
Magnus Schjerfbeck, architect
Simon Skrabb, footballer
Philip Ulric Strengberg, prominent businessman and majority owner of the local tobacco factory in the 19th century
Heidi Sundblad-Halme, composer and founder of the Helsinki Women’s Orchestra

See also 
 Kristinestad

References

External links 
 
 
 Town of Jakobstad – Official site
 Österbottens Tidning – Local newspaper
 Jakobs Dagar
  Chicorymuseum  - Chicorymuseum

 
Cities and towns in Finland
Grand Duchy of Finland
1652 establishments in Sweden
Populated places established in 1652